The Van Court Town House is a historic townhouse in Natchez, Mississippi, USA.

History
The land belonged to Joseph Quegles, a Spanish planter, in the early 19th century. It was purchased by James Ferguson, Quegles's son-in-law, in 1834. The townhouse was completed in 1836. Two years later, in 1838, it was purchased by Dr. Andrew Macrery. By 1870, it was purchased by Elias J. Van Court.

Architectural significance
It has been listed on the National Register of Historic Places since July 9, 1980.

References

Houses on the National Register of Historic Places in Mississippi
Federal architecture in Mississippi
Houses completed in 1836
Houses in Adams County, Mississippi